Russell Charles "Chick" Dermond (December 31, 1936, in Fair Lawn, New Jersey – May 9, 2015) was an American sprint canoer who competed in the late 1950s and early 1960s. His early years were spent in the American Canoe Association as a flatwater racer and began in the wooden "peanut," which was the predecessor of modern kayaks and C boats. A many-time national champion, he competed in the 1956 and 1960 Olympics. At the 1956 Summer Olympics in Melbourne, he was eliminated in the heats of the K-2 1000 m event. Four years later in Rome, he was eliminated in the repechages of the K-1 4 × 500 m event. He attended as Team Manager in 1972 and later served on the U.S. Olympic Committee. He was very active in the ACA, serving in a number of governing positions including Sugar Island in the Thousand Islands and Lake Sebago in Harriman State Park.

Dermond was a resident of Westwood, New Jersey.

References

External links
Sports-reference.com Russell Dermond's profile at Sports Reference.com
Russell Dermond's obituary

1936 births
2015 deaths
People from Fair Lawn, New Jersey
People from Westwood, New Jersey
Sportspeople from Bergen County, New Jersey
American male canoeists
Canoeists at the 1956 Summer Olympics
Canoeists at the 1960 Summer Olympics
Olympic canoeists of the United States